American Myth is a 2006 album released by Jackie Greene.

Track listing
"Intro" – 0:50
"Hollywood" – 4:59
"So Hard to Find My Way" – 4:10
"Just as Well" – 4:57
"I'm So Gone" – 4:13
"Never Satisfied (Revisited)" – 3:58
"Love Song; 2:00 AM" – 5:05
"When You're Walking Away" – 4:46
"Cold Black Devil/14 Miles" – 4:53
"Closer to You" – 3:57
"I'll Let You In" – 5:19
"Farewell, So Long, Goodbye" – 3:30
"Supersede" – 9:57
"Marigold" – 5:34

References

2006 albums
Jackie Greene albums
Verve Forecast Records albums